Chasten James Glezman Buttigieg (born June 23, 1989) is an American teacher, writer, and LGBT+ activist. He is married to Pete Buttigieg, the current U.S. secretary of transportation. He was an advisor, spokesperson, and social media campaigner during his husband's 2020 presidential campaign. In September 2020, Buttigieg released his debut memoir, I Have Something to Tell You.

Early life and education 
Buttigieg was born Chasten James Glezman, on June 23, 1989, in Traverse City, Michigan, to Sherri (née Pelon) and Terry Glezman, owners of a landscaping business. The youngest of three brothers, he was raised in Chums Corner in a conservative Roman Catholic family. As a teenager, Buttigieg worked at a cherry products store called Cherry Republic and drove tractors on his grandfather's cherry farm in Suttons Bay. He won a blue ribbon in pit spitting at the National Cherry Festival.

Buttigieg attended Traverse City West Senior High School and spent his senior year as an exchange student in Germany. He took classes at Northwestern Michigan College before attending the University of Wisconsin–Eau Claire; he graduated in 2014 with a bachelor's degree in theater and global studies. Later, Buttigieg attended DePaul University in Chicago where he received a Master of Education degree in 2017. That summer, Buttigieg began a AMS/MACTE certificate from Xavier University.

Career 
After graduating from college, Buttigieg moved to Milwaukee, where he worked as a teaching artist for First Stage Children's Theater as well as in classroom settings in the greater Milwaukee area.

While pursuing his graduate degree, he was a substitute teacher in both Chicago and South Bend public schools. In fall 2017, Buttigieg began as a junior high humanities teacher at the Montessori Academy in Mishawaka, Indiana. He also taught theater and ran a diversity club. He took a leave of absence to support his husband's campaign. In January 2019, Buttigieg joined the Civic Education Team of the South Bend Civic Theatre as the Director of Curriculum.

In 2016, Buttigieg was a State Democratic Delegate for St. Joseph County. He was the first gentleman of South Bend, Indiana from June 16, 2018, to January 1, 2020.

2020 presidential election 

Buttigieg was a campaign spokesperson, advisor, and social media campaigner for his husband Pete Buttigieg's campaign He was called Pete's “not-so-secret public-relations weapon.” If his husband had been elected, Chasten identified improving the nation's public schools, arts education, and mental health as the areas he would have focused on as First Gentleman. He also supports LGBTQ rights.

After his husband's withdrawal from the race, both endorsed Joe Biden and campaigned for him. Pete Buttigieg ended up placing fifth in terms of number of delegates. Since the campaign, Buttigieg now considers Kamala Harris and Doug Emhoff close friends.

Post-presidential campaign 
Buttigieg was a Harvard Institute of Politics Fellow for the fall 2020 virtual semester. On September 1, 2020, Buttigieg released his debut memoir, I Have Something to Tell You. The hardcover edition debuted at number 12 on The New York Times Best Seller list for hardcover non-fiction. In December 2020, Buttigieg criticized Joseph Epstein's op-ed about Jill Biden's academic credentials, calling it sexist.

Personal life 

Buttigieg came out to his family at 18 and soon moved out, living with friends and in his car. In 2020, Buttigieg shared in his memoir that he was sexually assaulted by a friend of a friend when he was 18. The experience left him feeling ashamed for years. Buttigieg now has a "great relationship" with his parents.

Buttigieg lives in Washington, D.C. with his husband, Pete Buttigieg, who is the current U.S. Secretary of Transportation. The two first met on the dating app Hinge in summer 2015. They met in person that August while Chasten was in graduate school. They got engaged in December 2017 at O'Hare International Airport and married on June 16, 2018, at the Episcopal Cathedral of St. James in South Bend; the two appeared at the South Bend Gay Pride block party following their nuptials. On August 17, 2021, Buttigieg announced on his personal Twitter account that he and his husband had become parents. On September 4, Pete Buttigieg tweeted a photo of the couple with their newborn twins, a son and a daughter.

Buttigieg used to perform improv comedy in and around the Chicago area.

Published works 
 I Have Something to Tell You: A Memoir (2020)

References

External links

 
 

1989 births
21st-century American educators
21st-century American male writers
21st-century Roman Catholics
Activists from Indiana
Activists from Michigan
21st-century American memoirists
Catholics from Indiana
Catholics from Michigan
DePaul University alumni
American gay writers
Indiana Democrats
Gay memoirists
LGBT people from Indiana
LGBT people from Michigan
American LGBT rights activists
LGBT Roman Catholics
Living people
Michigan Democrats
People from Traverse City, Michigan
Pete Buttigieg
Schoolteachers from Indiana
Schoolteachers from Michigan
Spouses of Indiana politicians
University of Wisconsin–Eau Claire alumni
Writers from Michigan
Writers from South Bend, Indiana